Year 623 (DCXXIII) was a common year starting on Saturday (link will display the full calendar) of the Julian calendar. The denomination 623 for this year has been used since the early medieval period, when the Anno Domini calendar era became the prevalent method in Europe for naming years.

Events 
 By place 

 Byzantine Empire 
 Byzantine–Sassanid War: Emperor Heraclius invades Armenia, leaving his son Constantine (age 11) and co-regent Bonus to defend Constantinople against the Persians still at Chalcedon (modern Turkey). He sails with 5,000 reinforcements to join the Byzantine army at Trapezus. Raising additional forces in Pontus, Heraclius strikes through the mountains of Armenia and the northern sub-Caucasian principalities. He plunders Media (Azerbaijan), and avoids the Persian armies who attempt to trap him.

 Europe 
 King Clothar II gives Austrasia to his son Dagobert I, age 20, effectively granting the kingdom semi-autonomy in repayment for the support of its nobles, most notably Pepin of Landen (Mayor of the Palace), and in recognition of calls from the Austrasians for a king of their own. Arnulf, bishop of Metz, becomes advisor to Dagobert.
 Samo, reputedly a Frankish merchant, is elected king of the Slavs in Moravia, Slovakia and Lower Austria. A string of victories over the Avars proves his utilitas (usefulness) to his subjects, and he secures the throne to establish his own kingdom, which stretches from the upper Elbe to the Danube.

 Asia 
 Tuyuhun invasion of Gansu: Tang forces under Chai Shao defeat the Tuyuhun, and prevent further incursions into Gansu (China).

 By topic 

 Art 
 Tori Busshi makes "Shaka Triad", in the kon-dō of Hōryū-ji, during the Asuka period (approximate date).

 Religion 
 The Jewish community in Medina (Saudi Arabia) rejects the idea of Muhammad being a leader of Judaism. He and his followers stop bowing toward Jerusalem and start bowing toward Ka'ba. Muhammad abandons Saturday as the Sabbath.

Births 
 March 28 – Marwan I, Muslim Caliph (d. 685)

Deaths 
 Jizang, Chinese Buddhist monk (b. 549)
 Liu Heita, rebel leader during the Tang Dynasty
 Lupus of Sens, French bishop (approximate date)
 Pingyang, princess of the Tang Dynasty (b. 598)
 Su Wei, high official of the Sui Dynasty (b. 542)
 Xu Yuanlang, rebel leader during the Sui Dynasty

References

Sources